Hohoe Municipal District is one of the eighteen districts in Volta Region, Ghana. Originally created as an ordinary district assembly in 1988 when it was known as Hohoe District, until it was elevated to municipal district assembly status on 29 February 2008 to become Hohoe Municipal District. However on 28 June 2012, the southern part of the district was split off to create Afadzato South District; thus the remaining part has been retained as Hohoe Municipal District. The municipality is located in the northern part of Volta Region and has Hohoe as its capital town.

Sources
 
 Hohoe Municipal on GhanaDistricts.com

References

Districts of Volta Region